Polygiton pachypus is a moth in the family Depressariidae, and the only species in the genus Polygiton. It was described by Alexey Diakonoff in 1955 and is found in New Guinea.

References

Moths described in 1955
Hypertrophinae